Cornucopiae is a genus of Mediterranean and Middle Eastern plants in the grass family. Common name is hooded grass.

Species

Cornucopiae alopecuroides L. - Syria, Lebanon, Palestine, Israel
Cornucopiae cucullatum L. - Italy, Greece, Turkey, Syria, Palestine, Iraq

formerly included

see Agrostis 
Cornucopiae altissima - Agrostis perennans
Cornucopiae altissimum - Agrostis perennans
Cornucopiae hyemale - Agrostis hyemalis
Cornucopiae perennans - Agrostis perennans

References

Pooideae
Poaceae genera